Bear River may mean:

Populated places 
 Bear River, Minnesota
 Bear River City, Utah
 Bear River City, Wyoming
 Bear River, Wyoming
 Bear River, Nova Scotia
 Bear River, Prince Edward Island

Rivers

Canada 
Alberta
 Bear River (Alberta), a river in the Peace Country of northwestern Alberta

British Columbia
 Bear River (British Columbia), a river in British Columbia, entering the head of the Portland Canal at the community of Stewart
 Bear River (Sustut River), a river in the northwestern Omineca Country of the British Columbia Interior, tributary to the Skeena River via the Sustut River 
 Bedwell River, once officially, and still commonly, known as Bear River, in the Clayoquot Sound area of Vancouver Island, British Columbia

Nova Scotia
 Bear River (Nova Scotia)

Ontario
Bear River (Ontario), a river in the Timiskaming District of Ontario

United States 
California
 Bear River (Mokelumne River tributary)
 Bear River (Feather River tributary)
 Bear River (Humboldt County)

Colorado
 Bear River (Colorado)

Georgia
 Bear River (Georgia)

Maine
 Bear River (Androscoggin River)
 Bear River (Long Lake)

Massachusetts
 Bear River (Massachusetts), a river in Massachusetts

Michigan
 Bear River (Michigan)

Minnesota
 Bear River (Big Fork River)
 Bear River (Leech Lake River)
 Bear River (Sturgeon River)

Utah
 Bear River (Great Salt Lake), a river in Utah, Wyoming, and Idaho that empties into the Great Salt Lake

Washington
 Bear River (Washington)

Wisconsin
 Bear River (Wisconsin), a river in Wisconsin

Other 
 Bear River (tribe), a Native American group in California, United States
 Bear River First Nation, a government of the indigenous Mi'kmaq people located in Bear River, Nova Scotia, Canada
 Bear River Massacre, an 1863 massacre of Shoshone by the United States Army in Idaho, United States
 Bear River Glacier, the official name of the glacier enshrined in Bear Glacier Provincial Park near Stewart, British Columbia, Canada
 Bear River High School, a public high school in Grass Valley, California, United States
 Bear River Pass, a pass to the north of Stewart, British Columbia, Canada, at the divide between the basins of the Bear and Meziadin Rivers
 Bear River Range, a mountain range located in northeastern Utah and southeastern Idaho

See also 

 Bear Lake (disambiguation)
 Bear Brook (disambiguation)
 Bear Creek (disambiguation)